Thomas Hamilton Bell (November 12, 1878 – March 14, 1939) was a politician in Ontario, Canada. He was a Conservative member of the Legislative Assembly of Ontario from 1929 to 1934 who represented the downtown Toronto riding of Bellwoods.

Background
He was born in Wellington County, the son of James R. Bell and Barbara Finley. Bell was educated in Laurel, Toronto, Orangeville and London. In 1901, he married Charlotte Wallace. Bell was general manager and secretary-treasurer for an insurance company. He died of a hemorrhage in Toronto in 1939.

Politics
Bell ran in the 1929 provincial election as the Conservative candidate in the Toronto riding of Bellwoods. He defeated Liberal candidate George Watson by 3,722 votes. He sat as a backbench supporter in the government of Howard Ferguson. In the 1934 election he was defeated by Liberal candidate Arthur Roebuck by 3,005 votes.

References

External links

1878 births
1939 deaths
Politicians from Toronto
Progressive Conservative Party of Ontario MPPs